Carlos Martínez Diarte (26 January 1954 – 29 June 2011), better known as Lobo, was a Paraguayan football striker and coach.

Career

As player
Diarte started his career in Olimpia Asunción and at the age of 16 he made his debut in the professional squad, helping Olimpia win the Paraguayan championship in 1971. His speed and goal-scoring skills were soon noticed by teams all around Europe, and in 1973 he signed for Real Zaragoza of Spain where he was part of the famous "Zaraguayos" group (a reference to the Paraguayan stars such as Saturnino Arrua and Felipe Ocampos that were playing for Zaragoza at that time). In 1976, Diarte signed for Valencia CF where he would be part of a formidable attacking line along with Mario Kempes and Johnny Rep. Diarte also played for UD Salamanca (from 1979 to 1980), Real Betis (from 1980 to 1983 where he scored 29 goals in 75 La Liga games) and AS Saint-Étienne of France (from 1983 to 1985).

In 1987, he returned to Olimpia Asunción to retire. In that year, he helped the team win the Paraguayan championship. Diarte was also part of the Paraguay national football team for several years.

As coach
Once Diarte retired as a footballer he became a coach and managed several teams including Valencia CF (1988), Deportivo Alginet, Atlético Madrid B (1997–1998), UD Salamanca (1998–1999) and Gimnàstic de Tarragona (2002)  all from Spain; Atl. Colegiales, Guaraní and Olimpia (as assistant coach) from Paraguay. He also managed the Equatorial Guinea national football team before being diagnosed with cancer.

Death
Diarte died of cancer on 29 June 2011.

Titles

References

  
 

1954 births
2011 deaths
Paraguayan footballers
Association football forwards
Club Olimpia footballers
Real Zaragoza players
Valencia CF players
UD Salamanca players
Gimnàstic de Tarragona footballers
Real Betis players
AS Saint-Étienne players
Paraguayan Primera División players
La Liga players
Ligue 1 players
Paraguayan expatriate footballers
Paraguayan expatriate sportspeople in Spain
Paraguayan expatriate sportspeople in France
Expatriate footballers in Spain
Expatriate footballers in France
Paraguay international footballers
Paraguayan football managers
Atlético Madrid B managers
UD Salamanca managers
Gimnàstic de Tarragona managers
Club Guaraní managers
Club Olimpia managers
Equatorial Guinea national football team managers
Paraguayan expatriate football managers
Paraguayan expatriate sportspeople in Equatorial Guinea
Expatriate football managers in Spain
Expatriate football managers in Equatorial Guinea